Hencke is a surname. Notable persons with that surname include:

 David Hencke, British investigative journalist and writer
 Karl Ludwig Hencke (1793–1866), German astronomer
 Harald Schultz-Hencke (1892–1953), German psychoanalyst

See also 
 Henke
 Henkes

German-language surnames